Lispothrips is a genus of thrips in the family Phlaeothripidae.

Species
 Lispothrips birdi
 Lispothrips brevicruralis
 Lispothrips crassipes
 Lispothrips populi
 Lispothrips salicarius
 Lispothrips wasastjernae

References

Phlaeothripidae
Thrips
Thrips genera